The 2021 Indianapolis 500 (branded as the 105th Running of the Indianapolis 500 presented by Gainbridge for sponsorship reasons) was a 500-mile (800 km, 200 lap) race in the 2021 IndyCar Series, held on May 30, 2021, at the Indianapolis Motor Speedway in Speedway, Indiana. The month of May activities formally began on May 15 with the GMR Grand Prix on the combined road course. Practice for the Indianapolis 500 began on May 18, and time trials were held May 22–23. Carb Day, the traditional final day of practice, took place on May 28.

On April 21, 2021, the track management announced that due to the COVID-19 pandemic, the event would be held with a limit of 135,000 spectators, approximately 40% capacity. The previous year's race was postponed from May 24 to August 23, then ultimately held without spectators, as was the GMR Grand Prix (which was moved to July 4).  The Intercontinental GT Challenge meeting in October 2020, which included the twin road course races for INDYCAR, carried a 10,000 spectator limit, with spectators restricted to grandstands in the Turns 1-4 and Turns 12-14.

Scott Dixon, the winner in 2008, won the pole position, and was a heavy favorite to win. Dixon, however, ran out of fuel during the first sequence of pit stops, as a result of a caution coming out, closing the pits and trapping him out on the track. He had to make a stop for emergency service, but the crew could not refire the stalled engine before he fell a lap down, and essentially out of contention. Two-time winner Takuma Sato (2017, 2020) was the defending champion, and led as late as lap 193, but he was off-sequence with the other leaders. Sato had to pit for fuel with seven laps to go, and finished 14th.

Three-time winner (2001, 2002, 2009), and four-time pole winner (2003, 2007, 2009, 2010) Hélio Castroneves took the lead for the final time on lap 199, and won his record-tying fourth Indianapolis 500 after dueling with second-year driver Álex Palou for most of the final 80 laps. Castroneves joined Hall of Fame drivers A. J. Foyt, Al Unser Sr. and Rick Mears as four-time winners. After the race, Castroneves celebrated his victory by climbing the catch fence, his signature celebration, which had earned him the nickname "Spider-Man" early in his career. The race was also the first IndyCar Series victory for Meyer Shank Racing.

Race background

Sponsorship
On January 31, 2019, it was announced that the online financial services company Gainbridge would become the new presenting sponsor of the 500 under a four-year deal. This will be the third year under the current deal.

Rule changes
The temperature requirement rule was changed to "45-45". That required both the ambient temperature to be  or higher, and the track surface temperature to be  or higher before cars were allowed out on the circuit. Previously the rule was "50-50".
The Last Chance qualifying session was expanded to 75 minutes in order to allow multiple qualifying attempts for each participant. In 2019 participants were permitted only one attempt. This change was supposed to be implemented for 2020, however, only 33 cars were entered and the 2020 Last Chance qualifying session was cancelled.
Each entry was allowed 34 total sets of tires (Firestone), for practice, time trials, and for the race. Entries taking part in the Rookie Orientation Program received an additional three sets for use during that session. Entries taking part in a Refresher Test received two additional sets for use during that session. From 2015 to 2019, teams were permitted 36 total sets. In 2020, teams were also allowed 34 sets, however, there was one fewer day of practice in 2020 compared to 2021.

Event changes
Due to the COVID-19 pandemic, for the second year in a row, the annual Pit Stop Challenge was not held. In addition, the Carb Day concert and Snake Pit concerts were also cancelled.
As public address announcer Bob Jenkins is reducing his schedule while battling brain cancer (this was his last Speedway meeting, as he would die before the next major Speedway meeting, Allen Bestwick will join the public address system at the Speedway.

2021 IndyCar Series

The 2021 Indianapolis 500 was the sixth race of the 2021 NTT IndyCar Series season. Five different drivers won the first five races of the season, including three first-time winners. Álex Palou won the season opener at Birmingham, his first career IndyCar Series win. The following week, Colton Herta won at St. Petersburg. A doubleheader weekend at Texas saw Scott Dixon and first-time victor Pato O'Ward as race winners. The GMR Grand Prix kicked off the month of May at Indianapolis on May 15, won by Rinus VeeKay, the third first-time winner of the season. Scott Dixon entered the Indianapolis 500 as the series points leader. For the first time since 2013, Team Penske failed to win a race prior to the Indy 500.

Race schedules
The 2021 IndyCar Series schedule was announced on October 1, 2020. The Indianapolis 500 returned to its traditional Memorial Day weekend date after being delayed to August 23 in 2020 due to the COVID-19 pandemic. The race was scheduled for Sunday, May 30, the 54th time the race has been held on May 30. From 1911 to 1970, the race was scheduled for May 30 regardless of the day of the week, as Memorial Day at the time was a fixed-date holiday. During that period, if May 30 fell on a Sunday, the race was scheduled for Monday, May 31. Since 1974, the race has traditionally been scheduled for the Sunday of Memorial Day weekend.

Practice, time trials, and other ancillary events were scheduled for the two weeks leading up to the race. The Freedom 100, however, was not held as the 2021 Indy Lights season only included a race on the road course during GMR Grand Prix weekend.

The GMR Grand Prix returned to the month of May, again serving as the opening weekend of track activity. The Road to Indy held doubleheader races on both Friday and Saturday, while IndyCar held practice and qualifying on Friday, and their race on Saturday. In 2020, due to the COVID-19 pandemic, the IndyCar event was moved to July 4 (as part of the NASCAR weekend), the Road to Indy events were moved to September, and a second IndyCar road course event (Harvest GP) was held in October as part of the Intercontinental GT weekend. The 2020 GMR Grand Prix was held without spectators, while the October Harvest GP races were held with a maximum of 10,000 spectators.

Source: 2021 Indianapolis 500 Event Schedule

Entry list

The entry list for the 2021 Indianapolis 500 was released on May 12, 2021. Thirty-five entries appeared on the list, including nine former race winners and three rookies. With thirty-five entries, bumping returned for the first time since 2019. An expected 36th entry for driver Cody Ware set to drive for Dale Coyne Racing with Rick Ware Racing was withdrawn shortly before the entry list was released due to lack of sponsorship. All entries utilized the Dallara DW12 chassis with the Universal Aero Kit 18, with Firestone tires. The nine former Indy 500 winners making the field the most since there were ten in 1992.

 Former Indianapolis 500 Winner
 Indianapolis 500 Rookie

Testing and Rookie Orientation

October 2020

An offseason test was scheduled at the Indianapolis Motor Speedway during the last week of October after the conclusion of the 2020 season. On Wednesday, October 28, Takuma Sato (Rahal) and Josef Newgarden (Penske) conducted test runs utilizing new aerodynamic pieces and configurations. Rain delayed the start of the session from 11 a.m. to approximately 12:30 p.m. Rookie Scott McLaughlin (Penske) completed the mandatory Rookie Orientation during the afternoon.

Track activity for Thursday, October 29 was rescheduled to Friday, October 30 due to a poor weather forecast.

On Friday, October 30, Sato and Newgarden were joined by Ryan Hunter-Reay (Andretti), Ed Carpenter (ECR), Pato O’Ward (Arrow McLaren SP), and Scott Dixon (Ganassi). The six-car session primarily focused on evaluation of new aerodynamic configurations in traffic. Cool temperatures delayed the start of track activity until approximately 12:15 p.m. No incidents were reported.

Engine hybridization test
A special oval test was held on Friday, March 26 at the Indianapolis Motor Speedway. It was originally planned for earlier in the week, but poor weather pushed it to Friday. The series oversaw test runs to attempt to replicate the effects of racing with KERS, which will be part of the new hybrid engine package scheduled to debut in 2023. Four entries, two Chevrolet and two Honda, took laps in choreographed sessions. The KERS simulation was implemented utilizing the existing Push-to-pass system. The drivers and teams involved were Scott Dixon (Ganassi), Josef Newgarden (Penske), Alexander Rossi (Andretti), and Pato O’Ward (Arrow McLaren SP).

No incidents were reported. Following the test, reactions from the drivers were mixed to negative. The horsepower increases were in the range of 50–60 HP, resulting in straight-line speed increases of 5–7 mph.

Open test — Thursday, April 8

Weather: , wind up to 21 mph, rain showers in afternoon
Summary: A full-field open test on the oval at the Indianapolis Motor Speedway was scheduled for April 8–9. A total of 32 car and driver combinations were scheduled to participate. Testing was scheduled to begin at 11 a.m., with a two-hour session for veteran drivers (21 eligible), followed by a two-hour session for rookie orientation and veteran refresher tests. The final three hours was to be open to all participants, including those that passed their tests in the previous session. Just twelve minutes into the session, Rinus VeeKay suffered a hard crash in turn one on his fifth lap, resulting in a broken finger. Rain at approximately 12:45 p.m. ended the day early for veterans. After the rain subsided, the track was opened for rookie orientation and veteran refresher tests from about 6:00 p.m. to 7:15 p.m.

Rookie Orientation / Refresher tests — Thursday, April 8

Summary: The rookie orientation and veteran refresher programs began just after 6:00 p.m. after track drying from earlier rain had been completed. A total of eleven cars took to the track during the session, with many drivers completing their refreshers. There were no major incidents, and the practice was only halted once for a track inspection. The rookie orientation test for 2021 consisted of three stages: 10 laps between 205 and 210 mph, 15 laps between 210 and 215 mph, and 15 laps over 215 mph. The veteran refresher test consisted of only the second and third phases.

Open test — Friday, April 9
Weather: , Mostly cloudy with brief rain showers around mid-day
Summary: Testing time was extended to make up for the previous day's truncated session, with the track now opening at 9:00 a.m. and closing at 6:00 p.m. 31 of the 32 entered cars for the test took to the track, with only Rinus VeeKay absent due to the damage sustained to his car in the previous day's wreck. The session was briefly interrupted just before noon for rain, but was resumed shortly thereafter. No major incidents occurred.

Practice

Opening Day — Tuesday, May 18

Weather: , Cloudy with occasional light rain
Summary: The opening day of practice was divided into three sessions. The first session was open to veteran drivers, the second to drivers needing to complete Rookie and Refresher tests, and the third open to all drivers. Max Chilton had minor mishap when a helmet air ventilation hose became dislodged from the cockpit and wrapped around the rear wing. Light rain interrupted veteran practice three times and caused a delay in the start of rookie/refresher testing. Rookie and refresher testing began just after 2:00 p.m. Only three drivers, R. C. Enerson, J. R. Hildebrand, and Stefan Wilson, were eligible and took part in the session. Both Hildebrand and Wilson completed both phases of their refresher tests. Enerson completed the first of three phases of his rookie test, but suffered a grease leak from the car's drive axle that prevented him from continuing. Enerson and Top Gun Racing did not return for the remainder of the day. Full field practice began almost immediately after the conclusion of the rookie and refresher session. The only significant incident of the session came at roughly 4:45 p.m. when Sébastien Bourdais's car caught fire behind the right sidepod after an apparent engine failure.

Wednesday, May 19

Weather: , Mostly cloudy
Summary: The track opened at 11:00 a.m. with a one-hour session for R. C. Enerson to complete the remainder of his rookie orientation testing. Enerson completed the last two stages of the test, but did not appear for the rest of the day after finishing. The track was opened to all competitors at 12:15 p.m. and remained open until 6:15 p.m. There were no significant incidents during the session.

Thursday, May 20

Weather: , Mostly cloudy
Summary: Higher temperatures resulted in lower speeds and reduced running in the heat of the day. Practice began with an unannounced photo op by the three Rahal Letterman Lanigan Racing cars down the frontstretch. The slow speed of the Rahal cars caught other competitors off-guard and resulted in a minor collision between Scott McLaughlin and Colton Herta. The Rahal team was later penalized for the incident with all three cars being not allowed to participate in the first thirty minutes of Friday's session. The first major incident of the week came at 4:14 p.m., when Santino Ferrucci lost control of his car and impacted the wall in turn two. Ferrucci required assistance walking to the medical car and was later sent to Methodist Hospital for examination of potential injuries to his left leg. Despite the wreck, Ferrucci was still the third fastest driver on the day. For the first time during the week, all 35 entries participated in a full-field practice session.

Fast Friday — Friday, May 21

Weather: , Fair
Summary: Friday saw engine boost pressures increased in preparation for qualifying runs over the weekend. Honda powered cars dominated the day, taking 12 of the top 15 spots in the speed charts. No major incidents occurred during the day. Following the session, the draw for qualifying order was held.

Time Trials

Qualifying — Saturday, May 22
Weather: , Overcast early, partly cloudy late
Summary: Time trials on Saturday determined the top thirty qualifiers which would be locked into the starting field. The nine fastest cars advanced to the Fast Nine Shootout scheduled for Sunday to determine the pole position. The slowest five cars moved on to participate in the Last Chance Qualifier to determine the final row of the grid and which two entries would not qualify.

On his second qualifying attempt, Álex Palou suffered a crash in turn 2 after losing control and sliding into the wall at corner exit. However, Palou had not withdrawn his previous time to make this attempt, and his initial time was still fast enough to make the Fast Nine session the next day.

One of the major stories of the day was the difficulties for 2018 winner Will Power. Power was bumped from the field after his initial run and was unable to bump his way back in on subsequent runs, relegating him to the Last Chance Qualifier session. Sage Karam, Simona de Silvestro, Charlie Kimball, and R. C. Enerson were also forced into the Last Chance Qualifier.

Honda-powered cars were once again dominant in qualifications, taking eleven of the top 15 positions and seven of the Fast Nine spots. Pietro Fittipaldi, who qualified 13th, earned the Fastest Rookie Qualifier award.

Bump Day/Pole Day — Sunday, May 23
Weather: , Sunny early, mostly cloudy late

Last Chance Qualifying
Last Chance Qualifying began at 1:15 p.m. The format was expanded to a 75-minute session, with each participant having one guaranteed attempt. Previously, the Last Chance session was limited to only one attempt per car. Entries were now allowed to make additional attempts, time-permitting, but were required to withdraw their previous time to do so. In addition, cars that had completed an attempt would have the time voided if they performed any subsequent work on the car before time ran out in the session. If any adjustments were made, or if any engine cooling efforts were performed, the car was automatically withdrawn and was required to make a new attempt.

Despite brushing the wall in turn two on his final lap, Will Power was second fastest, taking 32nd. Simona de Silvestro was third fastest, giving her the final starting position (33rd) for the race. Charlie Kimball and R. C. Enerson were 4th-fastest and 5th-fastest, respectively. Despite multiple attempts each, Kimball and Enerson failed to qualify.

Fast Nine Qualifying

It was Dixon's first IndyCar pole position since the 2017 race. VeeKay was also the highest qualified Chevrolet-powered entry in the field.

Following the conclusion of qualifications, a two-hour practice session was held.

Post-Qualifying practice

Post-qualifying practice — Sunday, May 23
Weather: , mostly cloudy
Summary: A two-hour practice session began at 5:00 p.m. following the conclusion of qualifications. Cars returned to their race-day boost levels, and practice runs were oriented on race set-ups.

Carb Day final practice

Carb Day — Friday, May 28
Weather: , intermittent rain showers
Summary:  Carb Day practice, the final practice before the race, was scheduled to begin at 11:00 a.m. However, rain showers delayed the start by over 2 hours, with practice not starting until roughly 1:30 p.m. Lower temperatures led to higher speeds for the drivers. The session was cut short by roughly 10 minutes due to further rain showers.

Due to limited attendance caused by the COVID-19 pandemic, the annual Pit Stop Challenge and concerts were not held.

Starting grid 

Failed to qualify

Race report
Weather: , Sunny.

First half
Ed Carpenter Racing teammates Conor Daly and Rinus VeeKay dominated the first half of the race. The race began with Scott Dixon pulling into the lead, but by the end of the first lap, Colton Herta had overtaken him. On lap 2, VeeKay moved into the lead and kept it for 29 laps. The lead cars remained in roughly the same order until the first round of pit stops began around lap 31. Ed Carpenter lost significant time when his car fell off its air-jacks and then stalled, dropping him down the order. In the midst of this pit sequence, Stefan Wilson lost his control of his car and wrecked entering pit lane, triggering the race's first caution period. The timing of the caution period caused several participants to make emergency service stops. The worst affected were pre-race favorites Dixon and Alexander Rossi, who both ran out of fuel entering pit lane. Both drivers fell off the lead lap trying to get the cars refired as a consequence. Due to the number of cars taking penalties for stopping for emergency service, the caution period lasted 11 laps while IndyCar officials determined the running order.

Racing resumed at lap 46, with Herta, VeeKay, and Daly as the top 3. After a few laps of racing, VeeKay moved into the lead briefly before being passed by his teammate Daly. Hélio Castroneves ran fourth. The next round of pit stops began at roughly lap 68, with no major incident. Daly and VeeKay retained their lead positions, while Patricio O'Ward moved into third. A slower stop dropped Castroneves to seventh. At the halfway mark of the race, the running order was Daly, VeeKay, O'Ward, Ryan Hunter-Reay, and Herta.

Second half
Another round of pit stops came around lap 103. Differing fuel strategies meant that several drivers extended farther, going as far as lap 118. Graham Rahal pitted at lap 118 from the lead, but was released without the left rear tire secured. As Rahal exited the pits, the tire came off of the car and sent Rahal spinning into the turn 2 wall, triggering the race's second caution period. As cars scrambled to avoid the debris from Rahal's wrecked car, Conor Daly struck the loose tire, damaging his front wing. The team elected not to repair the damage, but Daly never reclaimed the lead for the remainder of the race. After a reshuffling of positions from pit stops and the caution, Álex Palou now held the lead ahead of Hélio Castroneves, Patricio O'Ward, and Rinus VeeKay.

Racing resumed at lap 125, with the top 3 drivers exchanging the lead for several laps before settling back into their original order. More pit stops came at roughly lap 144, with the lead cars avoiding incident. Further back, Will Power spun his car trying to slow down for pit entry, causing him to fall off the lead lap. The running order remained Palou, Castroneves, and O'Ward, with Ryan Hunter-Reay moving up to fourth.

The final round of pit stops came at around lap 170. Castroneves came out ahead of Palou initially, but was quickly passed on track. Hunter-Reay's top-5 run came to an end after failing to slow in time for pit entry, resulting in a penalty. Further back, Simona de Silvestro spun and damaged her car entering pit lane, forcing her to retire from the race.

Finish

While the leaders had pitted for the final time, Felix Rosenqvist and Takuma Sato stayed out, hoping to get another caution period and allow them to reach the end of the race without making another pit stop. The caution never came, and both drivers were forced to pit for fuel after lap 190. This left Palou and Castroneves with the lead positions in the closing stages of the race. With two laps remaining, Castroneves overtook Palou to take the lead. Despite encountering a large pack of backmarkers on the final lap, Castroneves held off Palou to take victory. For Castroneves, it was his fourth Indianapolis 500 victory, equaling the record for most victories set by A. J. Foyt, Al Unser, and Rick Mears. He also became the fourth driver aged 46 or older to win the race. The 12-year gap between Castroneves' fourth win and his third win in 2009 is the second-longest gap between victories in Indianapolis 500 history, only after Juan Pablo Montoya's 15-year gap between victories in 2000 and 2015. It was also the first ever IndyCar race victory for the Meyer Shank Racing team. For his victory, Castroneves received $1,828,305 from a total purse of $8,854,565. Palou, the second-place finisher, took over the series points lead with his result. Simon Pagenaud took third position after climbing from a 26th place starting position. Patricio O'Ward and Ed Carpenter rounded out the top 5. Scott McLaughlin was the higher finishing of the two rookies in the race despite a pit lane penalty, netting him Rookie of the Year honors.

The race was noted for its competitive parity, with 361 overtakes made, including 35 for the lead between 13 different drivers. The race further set a record for most competitors still running at the finish, with 30 of the initial 33 starters still circulating.

Box score

 Points include qualification points from time trials, 1 point for leading a lap, and 2 points for most laps led.

 All 33 qualifiers utilized a Dallara chassis with the Universal Aero Kit 18 and Firestone tires.

Broadcasting

Television
The race was televised on NBC in the United States. The coverage began at 11:00 a.m. EDT. On May 28, it was announced that the race was not blacked out in the Indianapolis area for the fifth time in race history, airing live on WTHR (Channel 13), as all tickets had been sold out and reached 40 percent of venue capacity. This event hosted 135,000 fans on the circuit.

Mike Tirico and Danica Patrick returned for pre and post-race coverage, as they had done the previous two years. Patrick also drove the pace car during pre-race festivities. Jac Collinsworth made his Indy 500 debut as the Prerace Host on NBCSN. Dale Earnhardt Jr. returned for pre-race coverage after being absent for the 2020 event as a result of rescheduling (Earnhardt and Letarte were covering the Drydene Twin 500km at Dover International Speedway on the rescheduled weekend).

On May 4, Jimmie Johnson was announced as part of the broadcast team as part of the "Peacock Pit Box" crew alongside Steve Letarte.

The 2021 race was the final "500" for Robin Miller, who had covered the event for roughly fifty years at The Indianapolis Star, Racer, and on television through ESPN, Speed, and NBC. Miller died of leukemia on August 25, 2021.

Radio
The race was carried by the IndyCar Radio Network. The chief announcer or "Voice of the 500" for the sixth consecutive year was Mark Jaynes with Davey Hamilton as driver analyst. Recently retired Donald Davidson returned to the booth in a live capacity for the first time since 2019 as in 2020 due to the COVID-19 pandemic all of his appearances were taped. This year marked the debut of Alex Wollf as an on-air pit reporter. It also marked the debut of Scott Sander as a pit reporter.

1070 The Fan broadcast weeknights with Trackside with Curt Cavin and Kevin Lee. Speedway historian Donald Davidson retired at the end of 2020, and his longtime program The Talk of Gasoline Alley was no longer aired. In its place, a new Indianapolis 500 themed program title Beyond The Bricks was hosted by Jake Query (an IndyCar Radio Network veteran) and former WIBC personality Mike Thomson.

The 2021 race was the final "500" for Bob Jenkins, the former radio, television, and public address announcer, and emcee. Jenkins died August 9, 2021, from brain cancer. Jenkins had worked as a reporter/broadcaster at the race every year from 1979 to 2020, and had attended the race nearly every since 1960. Due to his condition, he attended the 2021 race only as a spectator, and sat for only brief pre-recorded pieces for the radio broadcast.

Footnotes

References

External links

Indianapolis Motor Speedway — Official site
NTT IndyCar Series — Official site

Indianapolis 500 races
Indianapolis 500
Indianapolis 500
Indianapolis 500
Indianapolis 500
21st century in Indianapolis